Dimitrios Kazazis (born ) is a retired Greek male volleyball player and current coach. He has 67 appearances with Greece men's national volleyball team and he was part of the Greek team winning the bronze medal at the 1987 European Championship in Belgium. He played for Greek powerhouse Olympiacos for 9 years (1985–1994), winning 8 Greek Championships and 5 Greek Cups. From 2012 to 2015, he was head coach of Olympiacos and coached the club to 2 Greek Championships (2013, 2014), 2 Greek Cups (2013, 2014) and 2 Greek League Cups (2013, 2015).

Clubs
  Olympiacos (1985-1994)

References

1966 births
Living people
Greek men's volleyball players
Olympiacos S.C. players
Olympiacos S.C. coaches
Panathinaikos WVC coaches
Volleyball players from Thessaloniki